Chesterfield Football Club is an English professional association football club based in the town of Chesterfield, Derbyshire, England. The team competes in the National League, the fifth tier of the English football league system. Chesterfield play their home games at the 10,500 capacity Technique Stadium, having moved from their historic home of Saltergate during the summer of 2010. Notable former players include record appearance holder Dave Blakey, who played in 617 of Chesterfield's league games, and 162 league goal club record holder Ernie Moss. The club contests numerous local rivalries, most notably with Nottinghamshire club Mansfield Town.

Chesterfield FC was officially established in 1866, though it would be the third incarnation of that name that turned professional in 1891 and changed its name to Chesterfield Town. Town entered the FA Cup for the first time the following year, and competed in the Sheffield & District League and Sheffield & Hallamshire Senior Cup, before joining the Midland League in 1896–97. A third-place finish in 1898–99 resulted in a successful application to the Football League Second Division for the following season. After ten seasons in the Second Division they failed to gain re-election to the League and returned to the Midland League in 1909. They were champions of that league in 1909–10. The club entered liquidation in 1915, and were reformed as Chesterfield Municipal in April 1919. They again rejoined the Midland League and finished as champions in 1919–20.

The club was renamed Chesterfield in December 1920, and became founder members of the Third Division North in 1921–22. They marked their tenth season in the division, 1930–31, by winning the title, though they only managed two seasons in the Second Division before suffering relegation. They again won the Third Division North title in 1935–36, and after World War II recorded their best ever league finish of fourth in the Second Division in 1946–47. However they were relegated again in 1950–51, and were relegated out of the Third Division in 1960–61. Chesterfield won the Fourth Division in 1969–70, and then won the Anglo-Scottish Cup in 1980. After relegation in 1982–83, they again won the Fourth Division title in 1984–85, though would again be relegated after five seasons in the third tier. They secured their return to the third tier with a 2–0 win over Bury in the 1995 play-off Final at Wembley.

Chesterfield reached the FA Cup semi-finals in 1997, but were relegated back to the basement division in 1999–2000. They made an immediate return to the third tier after securing a Third Division automatic promotion place in 2000–01. Relegated in 2006–07, they secured the League Two title in 2010–11, but were relegated from League One the following season. In 2011, Dave Allen took full ownership of the club and oversaw progress to two League Trophy finals; Chesterfield won the trophy with a 2–0 victory over Swindon Town in 2012, and finished as runners-up after losing 3–1 to Peterborough United in 2014. Chesterfield were crowned champions of League Two for a record fourth time in 2013–14, but remained in League One for just three seasons. Two consecutive relegations saw the club relegated out of the English Football League at the end of the 2017–18 season.

History

Potentially five or more teams have been called Chesterfield Football Club at different times.  A Derbyshire Times newspaper report from 2 January 1864 noted a scheduled game between "Chesterfield and Norton football clubs", suggesting that a Chesterfield FC, whether loosely or formally organised, was active from at least 1863.

A second Chesterfield FC was formally created as an offshoot of Chesterfield Cricket Club in October 1867.
The cricket and football clubs moved to the Recreation Ground at Saltergate in 1871, the same year that they became separate entities. However, a souring of the relationship between the two led to the closure of the football club in 1881, when it found itself homeless. Many players joined other local sides, notably Chesterfield Livingstone, a club that took up using the Saltergate site, and Chesterfield Spital, a team which competed in the early years of the FA Cup.

Three years later, in 1884, a third entity called Chesterfield Football Club was formed, again making its home at Saltergate. It drew in players from the preceding club and both Chesterfield Livingstone and Chesterfield Spital, though records show Spital continued as a separate club. After changing its name to Chesterfield Town, the club turned professional in 1891 and won several local trophies in the following two seasons, entering the FA Cup for the first time in 1892. For the 1892–93 season, the club wore an extraordinary playing strip of all dark blue with the Union Jack emblazoned across the front of the shirt. Chesterfield joined the Midland League in 1896, and successfully applied for a place in the Second Division of the Football League at the start of the 1899–1900 season, finishing seventh. After finishing bottom of the League three years in a row, the club failed to gain re-election to the League in 1909, returning to the Midland League.

In 1915 Chesterfield Town was put into voluntary liquidation and a new club with the same name was formed by a local restaurateur to play wartime football using locally based "guests" from Football League clubs. It lasted only two years before its management and players were suspended by the FA for illegal payments and the club shut down.

The current Chesterfield FC was formed on 24 April 1919 by Chesterfield Borough Council, seeing it as a way to spearhead improvements in local recreational provision. Initially called "Chesterfield Municipal", the club made great strides on the pitch in its first season, lifting the Midland League title – and did so despite three changes of management. However, The Football Association and the Football League had already made clear their vehement opposition to a council-run club and ultimately forced it to cut its ties and become independent, reflected in a name change to Chesterfield FC in December 1920.

In 1921–22, Chesterfield became a founder member of the new Football League Third Division North. Following the arrival of new manager Ted Davison in 1926 and chairman Harold Shentall in 1928, the club won the Third Division North title in the 1930–31 season with an 8–1 victory over Gateshead on the final day, and were promoted to the Second Division. Relegation followed in 1933, but the Third Division North title was again won in 1936.

After the war the club achieved their best League position, finishing fourth in the Second Division in 1946–47. However, the sale of several players at the end of the season reduced their overall quality, and Chesterfield were relegated at the end of the 1950–51 season. They were placed in the Third Division on its formation at the start of the 1958–59 season; future England international goalkeeper Gordon Banks made his professional debut in a Third Division game in November 1958, but was sold to Leicester City for a then-club record £7,000 fee at the end of the season. In 1961 Chesterfield were relegated to the Fourth Division for the first time.

Chesterfield spent eight seasons in the Fourth Division, earning promotion as champions in 1969–70 under manager Jimmy McGuigan. The Anglo-Scottish Cup was won in 1981. The club was relegated in 1983–84, and won the Fourth Division title the following season. Financial difficulties forced Chesterfield Borough Council to bail out the club in 1985 and the club's training ground to be sold. Relegation followed in 1988–89; Chesterfield reached the play-off competition a year later, but were beaten by Cambridge United in the play-off final. The arrival of John Duncan as manager in 1993 was followed in the 1994–95 season by play-off victories over local rivals Mansfield Town and Bury to earn promotion to the redesignated Second Division. The 1996–97 season saw Chesterfield beat six clubs including Premier League side Nottingham Forest to reach the semi-final of the FA Cup for the first time. The semi-final match against Middlesbrough was contentiously drawn 3–3 after extra time; Chesterfield lost the replay 3–0.

The club were relegated to the Third Division in 2000 following a run of 21 games without a win, and chairman Norton Lea was replaced by Darren Brown. The following year, Chesterfield were deducted nine points for financial irregularities after Brown attempted to avoid paying Chester City the fee agreed by the FA for Luke Beckett. Amid mounting evidence of fraud, he relinquished control of the club in March 2001 and ownership passed to a hastily organised fans' group, the Chesterfield Football Supporters Society. Massive debts run up by Brown forced the club into administration, but the team still secured the division's final automatic promotion place. (Brown was later sentenced to four years in prison following a Serious Fraud Office investigation that led to charges including false accounting, furnishing false information and theft).

Chesterfield were relegated to League Two at the end of the 2006–07 season, although they did reach the regional semi-final of the League Trophy and the fourth round of the League Cup in the same year. The club departed its historic home at Saltergate at the end of the 2009–10 season, and moved to newly built B2net Stadium. Chesterfield were promoted to League One after winning the League Two title in 2010–11 season. They went on to win the EFL Trophy for the first time in March 2012, defeating Swindon Town 2–0 in the Final. However, they were relegated from League One the following month, before again returning to the third tier as League Two champions at the end of the 2013–14 season under the guidance of manager Paul Cook.

Chesterfield secured sixth-place in League One at the end of the 2014–15 campaign, and went on to lose 4–0 on aggregate to Preston North End in the two-legged play-off semi-final. Cook departed at the end of the season and was replaced as manager by Dean Saunders. On 14 November 2016, majority shareholder Dave Allen resigned from his roles as chairman and director of the club. This signaled a crisis, and four days later a further four directors resigned from their roles. It was announced that Chesterfield was openly up for sale, and desperately needed some kind of investment in order to avoid administration. Mike Warner was installed as chairman on 19 November. Manager Saunders was then sacked in December 2015 and replaced by Danny Wilson.

On 8 January 2017, manager Wilson was sacked, with Gary Caldwell being announced as his replacement nine days later. On 16 September 2017, Caldwell was sacked after only achieving three wins in 29 competitive games, giving him the worst win record of any Spireites manager. On 29 September 2017, club legend Jack Lester was appointed the club's new manager, bringing with him Nicky Eaden as his assistant and former caretaker manager Tommy Wright as a first team coach. The new coaching team could not prevent a second consecutive relegation however, leading to the club playing outside the English Football League for the first time since 1921. In the Spireites first season in the National League they achieved a 14th-place finish.

Ownership of Chesterfield changed hands on 6 August 2020 with the Chesterfield FC Community Trust buying the club outright from previous owner Dave Allen. On 7 August 2020 Chesterfield FC Community Trust rewarded John Pemberton by appointing him full-time manager of the club following a spell as caretaker manager from January 2020 where he prevented relegation from the National League. Pemberton was sacked in late November 2020 following a poor start to the 2020–21 campaign, leaving Chesterfield in real danger of relegation from the National League. The club appointed young Gloucester City manager James Rowe.

In January 2022, club faced defending UEFA Champions League winners Chelsea in the third round of the FA Cup, who fielded a near full-strength squad, with Chesterfield managing to score a goal in a 5–1 defeat by the Premier League side. Less than a month later, Rowe was suspended over allegations of misconduct. He left the club in February. He was subsequently charged with sexual assault in September 2022. The club replaced Rowe with former manager Paul Cook.

Kit manufacturers and sponsors

Table of kit suppliers and sponsors:

Stadium

Chesterfield's historic ground was Saltergate, officially named the Recreation Ground, which was in use from 1872 to 2010. Saltergate's record attendance was 30,561, which was set when Chesterfield hosted Tottenham Hotspur in the FA Cup fifth round in February 1938.

Since the 2010–11 season, Chesterfield have played their home games at the £13 million B2net Stadium. The first match was against Derby County in a pre-season friendly, which Derby won 5–4, Craig Davies becoming the first goalscorer at the stadium. The first competitive fixture was against Barnet, which ended in a 2–1 win after Dwayne Mattis scored the opening League goal at the ground in the first half. Chesterfield suffered their first home league defeat at the B2net Stadium after a 2–1 loss to Burton Albion on 13 November 2010. The highest attendance at the B2net Stadium was 10,089 at home to Rotherham United which Chesterfield won 5–0 with Jack Lester getting a hat-trick.

On 13 August 2012, it was announced that, after the acquisition of b2net by Proact, the Stadium would be renamed the Proact Stadium. On 15 May 2020, it was announced that, from August, the stadium would be renamed again, this time to the Technique Stadium, after local education provider Technique acquired the naming rights.

Rivalries
Chesterfield's geographical position means that the club holds many local derbies. Their main rival is considered to be the Nottinghamshire club Mansfield Town, with the club contending a number of fiery encounters. This was intensified due to the Miners' Strike, with those in Derbyshire largely striking, while those in Nottinghamshire did not, leading to the latter being referred to as 'scabs'. The last fixture between the sides finished in a 1–0 win for Mansfield at the Proact Stadium in April 2018. Chesterfield also have strong rivalries with nearby South Yorkshire clubs Rotherham United, Sheffield Wednesday and Sheffield United. The fiercest of the three rivalries comes with Rotherham, with whom the Spireites have much animosity and mutual dislike. Chesterfield supporters' fondest memory of the fixture is a 5–0 victory over the Millers in March 2011. The rivalries with Sheffield United and Sheffield Wednesday both came to the fore with the two former Premier League clubs' descent into League One. The Spireites have encountered United much more in recent years, continuing to do battle in the third tier of English football until 2017.

A slight rivalry with Grimsby Town intensified with a number of feisty encounters over the years.  Supporters of both clubs often used to cause disturbances at the fixture, leading to the fixture becoming a slight grudge match.  Other smaller rivalries include Barnsley, Doncaster Rovers, Derby County, Notts County and Lincoln City.

Honours and achievements

League 
Third Division North (Tier 3)
Champions (2): 1930–31, 1935–36
Fourth Division / League Two (Tier 4)
Champions (4): 1969–70, 1984–85, 2010–11, 2013–14
Third-place promotion: 2000–01
Play-off winners: 1994–95
Midland League:
Champions (2): 1909–10, 1919–20
Runners-up: 1912–13

Cups 
League Trophy:
Winners (1): 2011–12
Runners-up: 2013–14
Anglo-Scottish Cup:
Winners (1): 1980–81

Derbyshire Senior Cup:
Winners (7): 1898–99, 1920–21, 1921–22, 1924–25, 1932–33, 1936–37, 2017–18

Notes
Derbyshire Senior Cup is competed for by all registered Derbyshire FA clubs. Until season 2010–11, Chesterfield and Derby County did not enter teams and in turn competed in their own competition called the Derbyshire FA Centenary Cup. Both Chesterfield and Derby County have fielded reserve sides in the Derbyshire Senior Cup since season 2010–11.

Club records

Players

Current squad

Out on loan

Retired numbers

Club staff

Current coaching staff

Managerial history

References

External links

 
Football clubs in England
Association football clubs established in 1866
1866 establishments in England
Sheffield & District Football League
Midland Football League (1889)
EFL Trophy winners
National League (English football) clubs
Former English Football League clubs
Football clubs in Derbyshire
Fan-owned football clubs in England